Ernest Ion Pool  (22 November 1857 in City of Westminster – 26 September 1931 in Hastings) was a British athlete who competed in the Marathon at the 1900 Olympic Games in Paris. He did not complete the race.

After he returned to England he wrote an article for the club magazine of the South London Harriers commenting on his experiences;

"The marathon turned out a dismal fiasco. The whole conduct of the race on the part of
the responsible officials, beginning with the tardy date of the announcement abroad down to
the smallest details providing, or rather failing to provide, for the convenience of contestants on the fatal day, and the entire absence of precautions to ensure fair play, can only be characterized by the one word “Presposterous” – with a capital P.

Add to this the non-sporting instincts of the French populace and it will not be necessary to cite fully the details of the troubles that invariably beset the strangers only bicycles and cars for obstacles.

At the best it proved a steeplechase, 25 miles is really too far for a steeplechase, but that was with mere circumstance. Suffice it to say that when the three placed men in last year's London to Brighton GAYP found it necessary to retire inside of four miles and Arthur Newton (a well known
long distance record breaker in the States), who was unwise enough to finish, took
longer than walking time to complete the distance, it shows that things were very, very wrong.
I could a further tale unfold...but 'no mattah.

References

External links 

Buchanan, Ian  British Olympians. Guinness Publishing (1991) 

Olympic athletes of Great Britain
Athletes (track and field) at the 1900 Summer Olympics
British male marathon runners
1857 births
1931 deaths
Place of birth missing
Athletes from London